The Fountain Green massacre is one of the most-frequently cited examples of violence between Utes and Mormon colonists surrounding the so-called Walker War. A Daughters of the Utah Pioneers monument (no. 172), located in City Park in Fountain Green, Utah, memorializes the Fountain Green Massacre.

Event
In the early morning hours of October 1, 1853, Utes of Sanpitch attacked and killed four men—William Reed, James Nelson, William Luke, and Thomas Clark—who were encamped at Uinta Springs, near the head of Salt Creek Canyon. The men were driving two ox-drawn wagons filled with wheat to Salt Lake City, as the advance party of a larger group headed by a local Manti, Utah, Mormon leader, Isaac Morley. William Luke, an immigrant from Manchester, England, was anxious to go see his three sons, who had recently arrived from England, and may have encouraged the group to hasten its journey. The four men camped at Uinta Springs against Morley's instructions, which had been for the group to make camp on the San Pitch River and await the arrival of the main group.

When Morley's group arrived at the camp, they found William Reed stripped, scalped, and disemboweled a short distance from the wagons. Luke and Nelson's throats were cut; they were also disemboweled. The Morley party emptied the wagons of their grain and then loaded three of the bodies for transport to Nephi, Utah (Clark's body later being  found by a relative) and as the party readied to move on, numerous Utes appeared on the hillside. Oral tradition holds that Morley, angry over disobedience to his orders, denied the dead men burial in the town cemetery.  Their gravesites are unknown, despite efforts to locate the remains of the four men.

Revenge
Soon after the massacre, eight Utes were murdered in Nephi, in an act of revenge. According to a prominent local woman:

In 2006 the remains of the slain Utes were discovered in an area of Nephi called Old Hallow.

Subsequent violence
A little less than five years later, four Danish immigrants—Jens Jorgensen, his wife Hedevig Jorgensen Jens Terklesen, and Christian I. Kjerulf—were slain by natives in Salt Creek Canyon, while they were en route to settle with other Scandinavian immigrants in the Sanpete Valley. This tragedy, known as the Salt Creek Canyon Massacre, was marked by the brutality with which Jorgensen's wife and unborn child were butchered with a tomahawk.

See also
 Latter Day Saint martyrs
 List of massacres in Missouri
 Missouri Executive Order 44
 Salt Creek Canyon massacre
 Utah War

References

Sources

19th-century colonization of the Americas
Wars fought in Utah
Massacres by Native Americans
-Fountain Green Massacre
Sanpete County, Utah
Ute tribe
Mormonism and violence
Mormonism and Native Americans
October 1853 events
1853 in Utah Territory